Bagalkot Lok Sabha constituency is one of the 28 Lok Sabha constituencies in Karnataka state in southern India. This constituency came into existence in 1967.First mp of this constituency is Sanganagouda Basanagouda patil. He is freedom fighter of this country.

Assembly segments
Presently, Bagalkot Lok Sabha constituency comprises the following eight legislative assembly segments:

Members of Parliament

Election results

General election 2019

General election 2014

See also
 Bagalkot district
 List of Constituencies of the Lok Sabha

References

Lok Sabha constituencies in Karnataka
Bagalkot district